Răzvan Radu (born 4 July 1984), is a Romanian futsal player who plays for City'us and the Romanian national futsal team.

References

External links

1984 births
Living people
Romanian men's futsal players